Nadir Mohamed Benchenaa (born February 2, 1984 in Stockholm) is a Swedish footballer of Algerian origin. He is a currently a free agent.

Career
Benchenaa started his career at Hammarby IF before joining Stade Rennais in June 2000 for 2.8million SEK. Benchenaa stayed in France for three years, and had a trial with Aston Villa during the 2000/01 season, before returning to Hammarby in the summer of 2003 and joining Örgryte IS on loan for the 2005 season. After his loan deal Benchenaa was sold to Assyriska on a two-year contract,  of which he only stayed for one before leaving for Gröndals in February 2007.  In January 2008 he moved to Germany with SV Babelsberg 03 for six months, before heading to Union Royale Namur in Belgium for another six months before signing for Khazar Lankaran in January 2009. Benchenaa returned to Sweden in the summer of 2009, joining Dalkurd  with whom he spent a year before once again moving abroad, this time with Algerian Ligue 1 side WA Tlemcen.

Benchenaa has also represented Sweden internationally at  U-21 level.

Career statistics

References

External links
 Dalkurd FF profile
 
 Stade-Rennais Profile

1984 births
Swedish footballers
Swedish people of Algerian descent
Swedish sportspeople of African descent
Footballers from Stockholm
Living people
Stade Rennais F.C. players
Hammarby Fotboll players
Örgryte IS players
SV Babelsberg 03 players
Expatriate footballers in France
Expatriate footballers in Germany
Expatriate footballers in Belgium
Expatriate footballers in Azerbaijan
Swedish expatriates in Belgium
WA Tlemcen players
Dalkurd FF players
Association football midfielders
Gröndals IK players
Swedish expatriate sportspeople in Azerbaijan